Chris Bourg is an American librarian, sociologist and former officer of the United States Army. She has been the director of Massachusetts Institute of Technology Libraries since 2015.

Career and education

Bourg graduated with a B.A. from Duke University and a M.A. from the University of Maryland. She went on to study sociology at Stanford University where she completed an M.A. and PhD. Her doctoral thesis titled Gender mistakes and inequality was supervised by Cecilia L. Ridgeway.

She worked at Stanford for 12 years where she held several roles including associate university librarian for public services. She started as the director of Massachusetts Institute of Technology Libraries, overseeing the library and MIT Press in 2015. She took over the role from previous director Ann Wolpert, who had been in the position for 17 years. Prior to her career in libraries, Bourg spent 10 years as an officer in the United States Army, teaching for three years as a faculty member at West Point.

Bourg is a frequent public speaker and has given multiple conference keynotes. In a 2018 keynote at a Code4LIb conference, she discussed diversity in software development. The talk, which referenced research by the Kapor Center for Social Impact indicating record numbers of people are leaving tech environments due to discrimination, resulted in online harassment and personal attacks.

Bourg is known for talking openly about and challenging systemic racism within the library profession. She has also called into question the neutrality of librarianship. During an American Library Association panel in 2018 Bourg argued against the possibility of neutrality concluding that: "If we believe that libraries have any role to play in supporting and promoting truth in our current post-truth culture, then our work is political and not neutral." Bourg has been equally vocal about open access publishing. In 2013 she resigned from the editorial board of the Journal of Library Administration, along with the editor-in-chief and other board members, as a sign of support for open-access publishing following the death of Aaron Swartz.

Select publications

Chapters

Articles

References

Living people
American librarians
American women librarians
Massachusetts Institute of Technology faculty
Stanford University alumni
Women in the United States Army
Duke University alumni
University System of Maryland alumni
Year of birth missing (living people)
American women academics
21st-century American women